Namira is a given name and a surname. Notable people with the name include:

Namira Salim (born 1975), Pakistani explorer and artist
Hamza Namira (born 1980), Egyptian singer-songwriter and multi-instrumentalist
 Namira Aliya H Djojohadikusumo (born 2000), Indonesian Model, Gadis Sampul Favorite 2019